The 2022–23 season is Veria's 4th season in existence and second appearance in the second tier of the Greek football league system, and 2nd after the foundation of the Super League 2. The contents of this article cover club activities from 1 July 2022 until 30 May 2023.

Players

Personnel

Management

Coaching staff

Source: Veria NFC

Transfers

In

Out

Pre-season and friendlies

Competitions

Super League 2

League table

Results summary

Regular season matches

Greek Football Cup

Third round

Fourth round

Fifth round

References

External links
 official website

Veria NFC seasons
Veria